Hannah Brown (born 20 February 1990) is a British female canoeist who won three medals at senior level at the Wildwater Canoeing World Championships and one at the Canoe Sprint World Championships.

Medals at the World Championships
Senior

References

External links
 

1990 births
Living people
British female canoeists
Place of birth missing (living people)